The  is a home computer created by Sharp Corporation. It was first released in 1987 and sold only in Japan.

The initial model has a 10 MHz Motorola 68000 CPU, 1 MB of RAM, and lacks a hard drive. The final model was released in 1993 with a 25 MHz Motorola 68030 CPU, 4 MB of RAM, and optional 80 MB SCSI hard drive. RAM in these systems is expandable to 12 MB, though most games and applications do not require more than 2 MB.

The X68000 has graphics hardware similar to arcade video games of the late-1980s, with custom coprocessors supporting scrolling, tiled backgrounds, and large numbers of sprites. There are multiple sound chips supporting 8 channels of FM synthesis; 2 channels of stereo, digital audio output; and one channel of pulse-code modulation audio. As such, video gaming was a major use of the X68000.

Operating system
The X68k runs an operating system called Human68k which was developed for Sharp by Hudson Soft. An MS-DOS-workalike, Human68k features English-based commands very similar to those in MS-DOS; executable files have the extension .X. Versions of the OS prior to 2.0 have command line output only for common utilities like "format" and "switch", while later versions included forms-based versions of these utilities. At least three major versions of the OS were released, with several updates in between.

Early models have a GUI called "VS" or "Visual Shell"; later ones were originally packaged with SX-WINDOW. A third GUI called Ko-Window exists with an interface similar to Motif. These GUI shells can be booted from floppy disk or the system's hard drive. Most games also boot and run from floppy disk; some are hard disk installable and others require hard disk installation.

Since the system's release, software such as Human68k itself, console, SX-Window C compiler suites, and BIOS ROMs have been released as public domain software and are freely available for download. Other operating systems available include OS-9 and NetBSD for X68030.

Case design
The X68000 features two soft-eject 5.25-inch floppy drives, or in the compact models, two 3.5-inch floppy drives, and a very distinctive case design of two connected towers, divided by a retractable carrying handle. This system was also one of the first to feature a software-controlled power switch; pressing the switch would signal the system's software to save and shutdown, similar to the ATX design of modern PCs. The screen would fade to black and sound would fade to silence before the system turned off.

The system's keyboard has a mouse port built into either side. The front of the computer has a headphone jack, volume control, joystick, keyboard and mouse ports. The top has a retractable carrying handle only on non-Compact models, a reset button, and a non-maskable interrupt (NMI) button. The rear has a variety of ports, including stereoscopic output for 3D goggles, FDD and HDD expansion ports, and I/O board expansion slots.

Display
The monitor supports horizontal scanning rates of 15, 24, and 31 kHz and functions as a cable-ready television (NTSC-J standard) with composite video input. It was a high quality monitor for playing JAMMA-compatible arcade boards due to its analog RGB input and support for all three horizontal scanning rates used with arcade games.

Disk I/O
Early machines use the rare Shugart Associates System Interface (SASI) for the hard disk interface; later versions adopted the industry-standard Small Computer System Interface (SCSI). Per the hardware's capability, formatted SASI drives can be 10, 20 or 40 MB in size and can be logically partitioned as well.

Human68K does not support the VFAT long filenames standard of modern Windows systems, but it supports 18.3 character filenames instead of the 8.3 character filenames allowed in the FAT filesystem. By default, Human68K will not consider any additional characters beyond the first 8 without the use of a special driver, therefore files and folders that are named the same when viewed through a 8.3 filename but different when viewed through a 18.3 filename will be considered the same. Human68K is case sensitive and allows lower case and Shift JIS encoded Kanji characters in filenames, both of which cause serious problems when a DOS system tries to read such a directory. If a X68000 user restricts themselves to use only filenames according to the 8.3 characters scheme of DOS, using only Latin upper case characters, then a disk written on the X68000 is fully compatible with other Japanese standard platforms like e.g. the NEC PC-9800, the Fujitsu FMR and FM Towns computers. The Japanese standard disk format used by the X68000 is: 77 tracks, 2 heads, 8 sectors, 1024 bytes per sector, 360 rpm (1232 KiB).

Expansion
Many add-on cards were released for the system, including networking (Neptune-X), SCSI, memory upgrades, CPU enhancements (JUPITER-X 68040/060 accelerator), and MIDI I/O boards. The system has two joystick ports, both 9-pin male and supporting Atari standard joysticks and MSX controllers. Capcom produced a converter that was originally sold packaged with the X68000 version of Street Fighter II that allowed users to plug in a Super Famicom or Mega Drive controller into the system. The adapter was made specifically so that users could plug in the Capcom Power Stick Fighter controller into the system.

Home arcade

In terms of hardware, the X68K was very similar to arcade machines of the time, and served as the Capcom CPS system development machine. It supports separate text RAM, graphic RAM and hardware sprites. Sound is produced internally via Yamaha's then top-of-the-line YM2151 FM synthesizer and a single channel OKI MSM6258V for PCM. Due to this and other similarities, it played host to many arcade game ports in its day. Games made for this system include Parodius Da! －Shinwa kara Owarai e－, Ghouls 'n Ghosts, Strider, Final Fight, Alien Syndrome, Street Fighter II: Champion Edition, Akumajo Dracula (Castlevania in other regions, the X68000 version was ported to the PlayStation as Castlevania Chronicles), Cho Ren Sha 68k (which has a Windows port) and many others. Many games also supported the Roland SC-55 and MT-32 MIDI modules for sound as well as mixed-mode internal/external output.

List of X68000 series

List of X68000 games

Technical specifications

Processors
Main CPU (central processing unit)
X68000 (1987) to SUPER (1991) models - Hitachi HD68HC000 (16/32-bit) @ 10 MHz
XVI (1991) to Compact (1992) models - Motorola 68000 (16/32-bit) @ 16 MHz
X68030 (1993) models - Motorola MC68EC030 (32-bit) @ 25 MHz
Sub-CPU: Oki MSM80C51 MCU
GPU (graphics processing unit) chipset: Sharp-Hudson Custom Chipset
X68000 (1987) model - CYNTHIA Jr Sprite Controller, VINAS CRT Controller, VSOP Video Controller, RESERVE Video Data Selector
ACE (1988) to X68030 (1993) models - CYNTHIA Sprite Controller, VICON CRT Controller, VIPS Video Controller, CATHY Video Data Selector
Sound chips:
Yamaha YM2151: Eight FM synthesis channels
Yamaha YM3012: Floating point DAC with 2-channel stereo output
Oki MSM6258: One 4-bit ADPCM mono channel @ 15.6 kHz sampling rate

Memory
ROM: 1 MB (128 kB BIOS, 768 kB Character Generator) 
Main RAM: 1-4 MB (expandable up to 12 MB)
VRAM: 1056 kB
512 kB graphics
512 kB text
32 kB sprites
SRAM: 16 kB static RAM

Graphics
Color palette: 65,536 (16-bit RGB high color depth)
Maximum colors on screen: 65,536 (in 512×512 resolution)
Screen resolutions (all out of 65,536 color palette)
256×240 pixels @ 16 to 65,536 colors
256×256 pixels @ 16 to 65,536 colors
512×240 pixels @ 16 to 65,536 colors
512×256 pixels @ 16 to 65,536 colors
512×512 pixels @ 16 to 65,536 colors
640×480 pixels @ 16 to 64 colors
768×512 pixels @ 16 to 64 colors
1024×1024 pixels @ 16 to 64 colors
Graphics hardware (VINAS 1 + 2, VSOP, CYNTHIA / Jr, RESERVE): Hardware scrolling, priority control, super-impose, dual tilemap background layers, sprite flipping
Graphical planes: 1-4 bitmap planes, 1-2 tilemap planes, 1 sprite plane
Bitmap planes
1 layer: 512×512 resolution @ 65,536 colors on screen, or 1024×1024 resolution @ 64 colors on screen (out of 65,536 color palette)
2 layers: 512×512 resolution @ 256 colors on screen per layer (512 colors combined) (out of 65,536 color palette)
4 layers: 512×512 resolution @ 16 colors on screen per layer (64 colors combined) (out of 65,536 color palette)
BG tilemap planes
BG plane resolutions: 256×256 (2 layers) or 512×512 (1 layer)
BG chip/tile size: 8×8 or 16×16
Colors per BG layer: 256 (out of 65,536 color palette)
BG colors on screen: 256 (1 layer) or 512 (2 layers), out of 65,536 color palette
BG tiles on screen: 512 (16×16 tiles in 256×256 layers) to 4096 (8×8 tiles in 512×512 layer)
Sprite plane
Sprite count: 128 sprites on screen, 32 sprites per scanline, 256 sprite patterns in VRAM (can be multiplied up to 512 sprites on screen with scanline raster interrupt method)
Sprite size: 16×16
Colors per sprite: 16 colors per palette, selectable from 16 palettes (out of 65,536 color palette)
Sprite colors on screen: 256 (out of 65,536 color palette)
Sprite tile size: 8×8 or 16×16
Sprite tile count: 128 (16×16) to 512 (8×8) on screen, 256 (16×16) to 1024 (8×8) in VRAM

Other specifications
Expansion: 2 card slots (4 on Pro models)
I/O Ports:
2 MSX compatible joystick ports
Audio IN / OUT
Stereo scope/3D goggles port
TV/monitor Control
RGB/NTSC Video Image I/O
Expansion (2 slots)
External FDD (up to 2)
SASI/SCSI (depending on model)
RS232 serial port
Parallel port
Headphone and microphone ports
Floppy Drives:
Two soft-eject 5.25″ floppy drives, 1.2 MB each
Two 3.5″ floppy drives, 1.44 MB each (compact models)
Hard Disk: 20-80 MB SASI/SCSI (depending on model) 
Operating Systems: Human68k (MS DOS-alike developed by Hudson), SX-Windows GUI
Power Input: AC 100 V, 50/60 Hz
Weight: ~8 kg (~10 kg Pro)

Optional upgrades
Upgradable CPU:
 HARP: Motorola 68000 @ 20 MHz
 REDZONE: Motorola 68000 @ 24 MHz
 X68030 D'ash: Motorola 68030 @ 33 MHz
 Xellent30: Motorola 68030 @ 40 MHz
 HARP-FX: Motorola 68030 @ 50 MHz
 Xellent40: Motorola 68040 @ 33 MHz
 060Turbo: Motorola 68060 @ 50 MHz
 Jupiter-EX: Motorola 68060 @ 66 MHz
 Venus-X/060: Motorola 68060 @ 75 MHz
Additional CPU:
 CONCERTO-X68K: NEC V30 @ 8 MHz, with 512 kB RAM
 VDTK-X68K: NEC V70 @ 20 MHz, with 2 MB DRAM and 128 kB SRAM
FPU (floating point unit) coprocessor:
Sharp CZ-6BP1
Sharp CZ-6BP2: Motorola 68881 @ 16 MHz
Sharp CZ-5MP1: Motorola 68882 @ 25 MHz
Xellent30: Motorola 68882 @ 33 MHz
Tsukumo TS-6BE6DE: Motorola MC68882, with 6 MB RAM
Sound card:
 Sharp CZ-6BM1: MIDI card
 System Sacom SX-68M: MIDI card
 System Sacom SX-68M-2: MIDI card
 Marcury-Unit: 16-bit stereo PCM @ 48 kHz sampling rate, 2× Yamaha YMF288 FM synthesis sound chips
Graphics accelerator & sound card: Tsukumo TS-6BGA
Graphics chip: Cirrus Logic CL-GD5434 (1994)
VRAM: 2 MB (2048 kB) 64-bit DRAM
Color palette: 16,777,216 (24-bit RGB true color depth) and alpha channel (RGBA)
Maximum colors on screen: 16,777,216
Maximum resolution: 2048×1024 pixels
Screen resolutions (all out of 16,777,216 color palette)
768×512 pixels @ 32,768 to 16,777,216 colors
800×600 pixels @ 32,768 to 16,777,216 colors
1024×512 pixels @ 32,768 to 16,777,216 colors
1024×768 pixels @ 32,768 to 16,777,216 colors
1024×1024 pixels @ 32,768 colors
1280×1024 pixels @ 256 colors
2048×1024 pixels @ 256 colors
Graphical capabilities: 64-bit GUI acceleration, blitter, bit blit
Audio capabilities: 16-bit stereo PCM @ 48 kHz sampling rate
Hard disk drive storage:
 Sharp CZ-5H08: 80 MB
 Sharp CZ-68H: 81 MB
 Sharp CZ-5H16: 160 MB

Legacy
In 2022, ZUIKI Inc. revealed a teaser for a new mini console called the X68000 Z, a miniaturized version of the X68000.

See also
MDX (X68000)
X1, the predecessor of the X68000

References

External links
Japanese Computer Emulation Centre 
Japanese site for official public domain software and ROMs
English site with X68000 Hardware information and emulators
X68000 review at old-computers.com

X68000
68000-based home computers
Home video game consoles
Home computers
Products introduced in 1987